Fuca was a clan of Manchu nobility. After the demise of the dynasty, some of its descendants sinicized their clan name to the Chinese surnames Fu (富/傅) or Li (李).

Notable figures

Males
 Arantai (d. 1699), served as the Minister of Works from 1687–1688
 Funingga (d. 1728), Arantai's son; political figure
 Maci (1652–1739), political figure
 Fuheng (1720–1770), Maci's nephew; political and military figure
 Fulong'an (1746–1784), Fuheng's second son
 Fuk'anggan (1754–1796), Fuheng's son; general
 Delin, Fuk'anggan's son
 Mingliang (1736–1822), Fuheng's nephew
 Mingrui (d. 1768), Fuheng's nephew; general
 Fumin (1673–1756), official
 Jingshou (1829–1889), served as one of the Eight Regents of the Tongzhi Emperor
 Zhiduan (d. 1871), Jingshou's son by Princess Shou'en

 Prince Consort

Females
Imperial Consort
 Empress
 Empress Xiaoxianchun (1712–1748), the Qianlong Emperor's first empress, the mother of first daughter (1728–1730), Yonglian (1730–1738), Princess Hejing (1731–1792) and Yongcong (1746–1748)

 Imperial Noble Consort
 Imperial Noble Consort Zhemin (d. 1735), the Qianlong Emperor's concubine, the mother of Yonghuang (1728–1750) and second daughter (1731–1732)
 Imperial Noble Consort Shushen (1859–1904), the Tongzhi Emperor's imperial noble consort

 Consort
 Consort Jin (d. 1823), the Qianlong Emperor's noble lady

 Imperial Concubine
 Imperial Concubine Tian (1789–1845), the Daoguang Emperor's imperial concubine

Princess Consort
 Primary Consort
 Gundei (d. 1620), Nurhaci's second primary consort, the mother of Manggūltai (1587–1633), Mangguji (1590–1636) and Degelei (1597–1635)
 Šurhaci's third primary consort (d. 1620), the mother of E'enzhe (1584 – 1638 or 1639), Amin (1586–1640) and third daughter (b. 1588)
 Yunki's second primary consort
 Yuntao's primary consort, the mother of second son (1706–1707) and Hongshi (1707–1710)
 Yunci's primary consort
 Yongrong's first primary consort (d. 1772), the mother of Miancong (1766–1780), second daughter (1768), Mian'ai (1769–1771) and fourth daughter (1770–1779)
 Yongxing's primary consort (d. 1813), the mother of Mianqin (1768–1820), first daughter (1770–1771), Mianyi (1771–1809) and third daughter (1775–1783)

 Secondary Consort
 Yinxiang's secondary consort, the mother of third daughter (1710 – 1711 or 1712)

 Concubine
 Daišan's concubine, the mother of tenth daughter (1638–1710)
 Fuquan's concubine, the mother of Zhansheng (1678–1681)
 Yunzhi's concubine, the mother of fifth son (1699)
 Yunyou's concubine, the mother of Princess (1726–1745) and tenth daughter (1728–1730)
 Yunlu's concubine, the mother of third daughter (1721 – 1722 or 1723)

See also
List of Manchu clans
Bordered Yellow Banner

References
 

Manchu clans
Bordered Yellow Banner
Plain Red Banner